Abul Hasnat ( – 16 September 2022) was a Bangladeshi politician and lawyer. He was the founding member of the Bangladesh Nationalist Party standing committee.

Political life 
Abul Hasnat served as the first mayor (elected by the commissioners) of Dhaka City Corporation during 1977–1982 and, again, in 1990. In the cabinet of Abdus Sattar, he served as the Minister of Housing and Public Works from 27 November 1981 to 10 May 1982.

Hasnat joined the Jatiya Party in 1990. He was elected to parliament from Dhaka-9 in 1990 in a by-election as a candidate of Jatiya Party. He served as Minister of Housing and Public Works in the cabinet of Hussein Mohammad Ershad from 20 October 1990 to 6 December 1990.

Hasnat later rejoined the Bangladesh Nationalist Party and served as a member of the BNP's standing committee.

References 

1940s births
2022 deaths
Place of birth missing
4th Jatiya Sangsad members
Bangladeshi barristers
Bangladesh Nationalist Party politicians
Housing and Public Works ministers of Bangladesh
Mayors of Dhaka